Model animation is a form of stop motion animation designed to merge with live-action footage to create the illusion of a real-world fantasy sequence.

Techniques 
Many types of models have been created and developed, and the choice mainly depends on the budget of the film:

Clay Models: Unlike most clay figures used for animation, clay models have an inner metal skeleton designed to allow them realistic movements and expressions.

Built-Up Models: These types of models are more expensive and detailed than clay models. They are made by building up pieces of foam on a metal skeleton to create a body, and then either brushing on several layers of liquid latex or casting soft rubbery skins and attaching then to the padded armature.

"Cast" Models: These types of models are the most expensive used in the industry and are longer-lasting than the other types. They start as clay sculptures onto which two- (or more) part molds are made in order to reproduce all the details. Then the mold parts are assembled with an armature inside, and they are filled with a liquid material (foam latex, silicone rubber, urethane foam, etc.) that then forms a soft rubbery "flesh" over the skeleton.

Works
Model animation was pioneered by Willis O'Brien, and it was first used in The Lost World (1925). His work also includes
King Kong (1933)
The Son of Kong (1933)
Mighty Joe Young (1949)
The Black Scorpion (1957)
The Giant Behemoth (1958)

Picking up the model animation baton from O'Brien, and refining the process further, introducing color and smoother animation, was his protégé, Ray Harryhausen. Assisting O'Brien in Mighty Joe Young in 1949, Harryhausen went on to do model animation (and other special visual effects) on a series of feature-length films, such as:
The Beast From 20,000 Fathoms (1953)
It Came from Beneath the Sea (1955)
Earth vs. the Flying Saucers (1956)
The Animal World (Opening Dinosaur sequence, with O'Brien, 1956)
20 Million Miles To Earth (1957)
The 7th Voyage of Sinbad (1958)
The Three Worlds of Gulliver (1960)
Mysterious Island (1961)
Jason and the Argonauts (1963)
First Men in the Moon (1964)
One Million Years B.C. (1967)
The Valley of Gwangi (1969)
The Golden Voyage of Sinbad (1974)
Sinbad and the Eye of the Tiger (1977)
Clash of the Titans (with Jim Danforth, 1981)

The third generation of model animators featured such notables as Jim Danforth, David Allen, and Phil Tippett.

References

Works cited

See also
List of stop-motion films
Go motion

Stop motion
Animation techniques